Haemateulia is a genus of moths belonging to the family Tortricidae.

Species
Haemateulia barrigana  Razowski & Gonzlez, 2003
Haemateulia haematitis  (Meyrick, 1931) 
Haemateulia placens Razowski & Pelz, 2010

References

 , 1999, Polish Journal of Entomology 68: 68
  2010: Tortricidae from Chile (Lepidoptera: Tortricidae). Shilap Revista de Lepidopterologia 38 (149): 5-55.

External links
tortricidae.com

Euliini
Tortricidae genera
Taxa named by Józef Razowski